Clearwater Air Park  is a city-owned public-use airport located  northeast of the central business district of Clearwater, a city in Pinellas County, Florida, United States. As of March 1, 2023, The airpark is managed by FlyUSA Inc.

Facilities and aircraft 
Take offs and landings are permitted from 7 a.m. to 11 p.m. For the 12-month period ending June 8, 1999, the airport had 50,590 aircraft operations, an average of 138 per day: 99.9% general aviation, <0.1% air taxi and <0.1% military. There are 139 aircraft based at this airport: 87% single-engine, 10% multi-engine and 3% helicopter.

References

External links 
 
  brochure from CFASPP
 
 

Airports in Florida
Airports in the Tampa Bay area
Transportation buildings and structures in Pinellas County, Florida